El Hombre de las sorpresas is a 1949 Argentine film.

Cast

 Elina Colomer as Margarita Cornel
 Francisco Martínez Allende as Esteban Artinelli
 Eduardo Sandrini as Enrique
 Alejandro Maximino as Dr Jusar
 Mario Baroffio as Aquiles Cornel
 Adolfo Stray as Inspector
 Esther Bence as Aunt Margarita
 Inda Ledesma as Sra. Bullosi
 Alberto Rinaldi
 Narciso Ibáñez
 Arturo Arcari
 Irma Denás
 Tita Stefani
 Andrés Vázquez

External links
 

1949 films
1940s Spanish-language films
Argentine black-and-white films
Argentine comedy films
1949 comedy films
1940s Argentine films
Films directed by Leopoldo Torres Ríos